Abdolhossein Mokhtabad (born 21 March 1966) is an Iranian singer and composer of Persian traditional music. He is a Gold Medal Winner of Global Music Awards 2020 and Silver Medal Winner in2022..

Career
Mokhtabad’s works are in the classical Persian style of Radif. He is also a player of the santur, setar, tonbak, and piano. After performing several concerts in Iran, and in countries abroad such as Greece, France, Netherlands, Switzerland, the UK, Sweden, Italy, Spain, Austria, Malaysia, Algeria, Oman, Canada, and the United States, he produced a variety of albums. Mokhtabad left Iran in 1998 to study Western classical music. After two years of studying for his B.A. at the University Of Ottawa in Ottawa, Ontario, Canada, he later went on to pursue his M.A. and doctorate degrees at Goldsmiths, University of London. Mokhtabad completed his Ph.D. in Western Composition and Ethnomusicology under Professor Stanley Glasser and Professor John Baily at Goldsmiths, University of London in 2008.

Mokhtabad currently resides in Tehran.

Education

2008: Ph.D. in Music, Goldsmiths, University of London
1984–89: Tehran University B.A, Sociology
1980–84: 29th of Aban High school, Sari, Iran Diploma, Economic
 1984–93: Vocal training and mastery of the Iranian 12 Modal suites with Ostad Karim Saleh Azimi (Iranian Radio Music Department)
 1988–91: Learn Setar at School of Music of the Art Organization for Islamic Culture
 1984–86: Learn santur & Tombak
 Art Center of Organization for Islamic Culture

Experience

1997-8    Member of the Music Council
2014       Dean of College of Art & Architecture of Islamic Azad University Central Tehran Branch
2013       Member of Tehran City Council (Elected by People of Tehran
2007       Member of Board of Directors of Iranian Music Association

 2006-8    The cultural and artistic adviser of President of Iranian Technical & Vocational Training Organization (TVTO)
 2005-7    The Cultural and Music Adviser and Head of Regional music in IRIB
 2005       Lecturer in Music Department of Iranian Radio and Television Organization
 1998       Lecturer The College of Iranian Radio and Television Organization (On leave with fellowship to pursue graduate study)
 1997-8    Member of the Music Council Iranian Radio and Television Organization
 1996-7    Director, SarV Cultural Center, Municipality 6 of the Tehran Metropolis
 1996–97 Member of Music Council of UNESCO in Iran

Professional Work

Tapes & CDs: (Albums and Singles) 

 Siah Mashgh - Collection of Iranian traditional songs, 2016
 Sayeh Doost - Composition and vocal performance, CD & Cassette, 2012
 Mah e Majles - Composition and vocal performance, CD & Cassette, 2007
 Sepid o Siyahí - Collection of songs, vocal performance, CD & Cassette, 2006
 Behesht e Man - Composition and vocal performance, CD & Cassette
 Rangin Kaman e Eshgh - Vocal performance and song, CD & Cassette
 Ghasedak - Vocal performance and song, CD & Cassette, 2002
 Ghoghay-e Jan - Vocal  performance and song, CD & Cassette, 1998
 Hamnava - Vocal performance and song, 1998
 Naz -o Niyaz - Composition and vocal performance 1998
 Zouragh-e Mahtab - Collection of songs, CD & Cassette, 1997
 Saqi-e Rezvan - Collection of songs, CD & Cassette, 1997
 Dagh-e Tanhaee - Vocal performance and song, Cassette, 1996
 Boy-e Gol - Composition, Vocal performance and song, 1995
 Shekveh - Composition, Vocal performance and song, CD & Cassette, 1995
 Safar-e Eshq - Vocal performance and song, CD & Cassette, 1994
 Tamana-ye Vesal - Composition, Vocal performance and song, CD & Cassette, 1993

Performances
2018  Tehran Vahdat Hall, Nobang e Mehr big band, accompanied voice Saba Mokhtabad
2017  Sari Rasool Hosseini Stadium (Folklore Band)
2017  Tehran Milaad, with Roodaki big band (2 nights)
2016  Tehran Milaad Hall, with Roodaki big band ( 2 nights)
2015  Tehran Milaad Hall, with Roodaki big band ( 3 nights)
2014   Japan, Tokyo, for Nowrooz Celebration
2014   Russia, Moscow, Kazan (Tataristan)
2013   Turkey, Konya City,  Arus Celebration, on the Path of Mevlana
2013    France (Paris) and Italy (Rom), Rudaki Orchestra, for Nowruz Celebration
2012    Iran, Sari, Rudaki Orchestra, for Behshar City's Flooding Victims
2012    Kazakhstan (Astana, Symphonic Orchestra of Kazakhstan)
2011    USA (Houston, Los Angelis)
2011    Canada (Montreal, Ottawa, Toronto)
2010    Malaysia (Kuala Lumpur & Johor Bahru)
2010    US (LA, San-Francisco)
2010    Canada (Toronto, Ottawa, Montreal)
2010    Tehran (Milaad Hull)
2010    Azerbaijan (Baku)
2010    Italy (Rome, Milan)
2009    Spain (Madrid), Austria (Vienna), and Iranian Symphonic Orchestra at Vahdat Hall
2008    Kuwait (Qurain Music Festival), Tehran Vahdat Hual
2007    Kuwait, Algeria, Tehran (Saad Abaad Palace and Fajr Music Festival)
2006    Concert, London, Paris (in UNESCO), Turkey (Rumi Festival) and Moscow
2005    Concert, London,
2004    Concert, Tehran (Fajr Festival)
2003    Concert, London, Tehran, Isfahan
2002    Concert, Chelsea Town Hall, London
2001    Concert, Gothenburg
2001    Concert, Vienna,
2001    Concert, Royal festival Hall London
2000    Concert and presentation, Durham, England
2000    Concert, Manchester, England
2000    Concert, Iran, Rudaki Hall
2000    Concert, U.S.A. Texas.
1999    Concert, Ottawa, and Toronto, Canada
1998    Concert, Burns, Switzerland
1998    Concert, Amsterdam and The Hague, the Netherlands
1998    Concert, Paris for UNESCO, France
1997    Concert, Montreal, Ottawa and Toronto, Canada
1997    Concert, Leeds, London and Oxford, England
1996    Concert, Dubai, UAE
1996    Concert, Muscat, Oman
1995    Concert, Ashgabat, Turkmenistan
1995    Concert, Dushanbe, Tajikistan
1994    Concert, Vienna, Austria
1994    Concert, Kuala Lumpur, Malaysia
1993    Concert, Thessalonica and Athens, Greece
1992-00  More than 30 concerts in Tehran and other Iranian cities

Essays and workshops

2000 Essay, "History of the Persian Popular Music" "Encyclopaedia of the Popular Music of the World" The Continuum International Publishing Group Ltd.
Book , Iranian Contemporary Art Music 2020 Gooya Publication
2022 "Book" "Postmodern Music/ Postmodern Thought, Edited by Judy Luchhead & Joseph Auner, Translate to Farsi by Abdolhossein Mokhtabab, Gooya Publication, Tehran,Iran.

References

 Global Music Awards - Music Competition

External links

 
 تمناي وصال
 همشهری آنلاین
 www.easypersian.com Biography

1966 births
Living people
Persian classical musicians
Academic staff of the Islamic Azad University, Central Tehran Branch
Tehran Councillors 2013–2017
People from Sari, Iran